Therapeutic Advances in Drug Safety is a peer-reviewed open-access medical journal published by SAGE Publishing covering research on drug safety. It was established in 2010 and the editor-in-chief is Arduino A. Mangoni (Flinders University).

External links

SAGE Publishing academic journals
Pharmacotherapy journals
Publications established in 2010
Continuous journals
English-language journals